Souk El Srayria (arabic : سوق السرايرية) is one of the oldest souks of the medina of Sfax.

Localization 
The souk occupied a big part of Souk El Haddadine.

Activity 
The souk was specialized in the manufacturing of the riffle butt called Srir in Tunisian dialect. And this is how the souk got its current appellation.

References 

El Srayria